Common name: centipede eaters.
Aparallactus is a genus of rear-fanged venomous snakes found in Africa. Currently, 11 species are recognized.

Description
Maxillary short, with 6-9 small teeth followed by a large grooved fang situated below the eye. Anterior mandibular teeth longest. Head small, not distinct from neck. Eye small, with round pupil. Nasal entire or divided; no loreal. Body cylindrical; tail moderate or short. Dorsal scales smooth, without pits, arranged in 15 rows. Ventrals rounded; subcaudals single (not divided or paired).

Species

*) Not including the nominate subspecies.
T) Type species.

See also
 Snakebite.

References

Further reading
Branch, Bill. 2004. Field Guide to Snakes and other Reptiles of Southern Africa. Third Revised edition, Second impression. Sanibel Island, Florida: Ralph Curtis Books. 399 pp. . (Genus Aparallactus, p. 63).

Atractaspididae
Snake genera
Taxa named by Andrew Smith (zoologist)